The 2015–16 Coppa Italia, also known as TIM Cup for sponsorship reasons was the 69th edition of the national cup in Italian football. It began on 2 August 2015 and ended with the final match on 21 May 2016. Juventus successfully defended their title after beating Milan 1–0 by Morata's goal after extra time. They secured a record eleventh title in the competition.

Participating teams

Serie A (20 teams)

Atalanta
Bologna
Carpi
Chievo
Empoli
Fiorentina
Frosinone
Genoa
Internazionale
Juventus
Lazio
Milan
Napoli
Palermo
Roma
Sampdoria
Sassuolo
Torino
Udinese
Hellas Verona

Serie B (22 teams)

Avellino
Bari
Cagliari
Catania
Cesena
Parma
Crotone
Latina
Livorno
Modena
Novara
Perugia
Pescara
Pro Vercelli
Salernitana
Spezia
Teramo
Ternana
Trapani
Vicenza
Virtus Entella
Virtus Lanciano

Lega Pro (27 teams)

Alessandria
Juve Stabia
Bassano Virtus
FeralpiSalò
Lecce
S.P.A.L.
Matera
Reggiana
Casertana
Benevento
Foggia
Pisa
Ascoli
L'Aquila
Cittadella
Ancona
Brescia
Pavia
Cremonese
Arezzo
Cosenza
Lucchese
Tuttocuoio
Südtirol
Catanzaro
Pontedera
Melfi

Serie D (9 teams)

Poggibonsi
Viterbese
Potenza
Sestri Levante
Lecco
Delta Rovigo
Rende
Fano
Altovicentino

source: legaseriea.it

Format and seeding
Teams enter the competition at various stages, as follows:
 First phase (one-legged fixtures)
 First round: 36 teams from Lega Pro and Serie D start the tournament
 Second round: the 18 winners from the previous round are joined by the 22 Serie B teams
 Third round: the 20 winners from the second round meet the 12 Serie A sides seeded 9-20
 Fourth round: the 16 survivors face each other
 Second phase
 Round of 16 (one-legged): the 8 fourth round winners are inserted into a bracket with the Serie A clubs seeded 1-8
 Quarter-finals (one-legged)
 Semi-finals (two-legged)
 Final (one-legged)

Round dates
The schedule of each round is as follows:

First stage

First round
A total of 36 teams from Lega Pro and Serie D competed in this round, 18 of which advanced to second round. The matches were played on 2 August 2015.

Second round
A total of 40 teams from Serie B and Lega Pro competed in the second round, 20 of which advanced to joining the 12 teams from Serie A in the third round. The matches were played between 8 and 10 August 2015.

Third round
A total of 32 teams from Serie A, Serie B and Lega Pro competed in the third round, 16 of which advanced to the fourth round. The matches were played between 14 and 20 August 2015.

Fourth round
Fourth round matches were played between 1 and 3 December 2015.

Final stage

Bracket

Round of 16
Round of 16 were played between 15 and 17 December 2015.

Quarter-finals
Quarter-finals were played between 13 and 20 January 2016.

Semi-finals
Semi-finals were played on 26–27 January and 1–2 March 2016.

First leg

Second leg

Final

Top goalscorers

References

External links

 Official site
 Bracket

Coppa Italia seasons
2015–16 in Italian football cups
Coppa Italia